The Tom fool's knot, also known as the conjurer's knot, bow knot and Greek fool's knot, is a type of knot sometimes considered a handcuff knot, though usually considered somewhat inferior to it. It is a good knot with which to commence a slightly fancy sheepshank. It is also used as a trick knot due to the speed with which it can be made. The knot has a number of mainly decorative but also functional uses, such as sailing, boating, camping and restraining people.

History
Tom fool's knot is believed to be the knot "epankylotos brokhos" described by the 1st century AD Greek physician Heraklas.

Tying
It is formed by making two loops, not exactly overlaying each other. The inner half of each hitch or loop is pulled under and through the outer side of the opposite loop.

See also
Handcuff knot, a similar knot sometimes incorrectly identified as a Tom fool's knot
List of knots

References

External links
 Ian Knot, shoelace knot based on Tom fool's knot